Belgium participated in the Eurovision Song Contest 2014 with the song "Mother" written by Ashley Hicklin and Rafael Artesero. The song was performed by Axel Hirsoux. The Belgian entry for the 2014 contest in Copenhagen, Denmark was selected through the national final Eurosong 2014, organised by the Flemish broadcaster Vlaamse Radio- en Televisieomroeporganisatie (VRT). The competition featured thirty competing acts and consisted of seven shows. In the final on 16 March 2014, "Mother" performed by Axel Hirsoux was selected as the winner via the votes of seven international jury groups and a public televote.

Belgium was drawn to compete in the first semi-final of the Eurovision Song Contest which took place on 6 May 2014. Performing during the show in position 10, "Mother" was not announced among the top 10 entries of the first semi-final and therefore did not qualify to compete in the final. It was later revealed that Belgium placed fourteenth out of the 16 participating countries in the semi-final with 28 points.

Background

In 2013, Roberto Bellarosa represented the country with the song "Love Kills", qualifying to the final and placing twelfth.

The Belgian broadcaster for the 2014 contest, who broadcasts the event in Belgium and organises the selection process for its entry, was Vlaamse Radio- en Televisieomroeporganisatie (VRT). The Belgian participation in the contest alternates between two broadcasters: the Flemish VRT and the Walloon Radio Télévision Belge de la Communauté Française (RTBF). Both broadcasters have selected the Belgian entry using national finals and internal selections in the past. In 2012 and 2013, both VRT and RTBF internally selected an artist to represent Belgium and organised a national final in order to select the song. On 3 June 2013, VRT confirmed Belgium's participation in the 2014 Eurovision Song Contest and announced that the Eurosong national final would be held to select their entry. This marked the return of a multi-artist Eurosong for the first time since 2008.

Before Eurovision

Eurosong 2014 
Eurosong 2014 was the national final that selected Belgium's entry in the Eurovision Song Contest 2014. The competition consisted of seven shows that commenced on 2 February 2014 and concluded with a final on 16 March 2014 where the winning song and artist were selected. All shows were hosted by Eva Daeleman and Peter Van de Veire and broadcast on Eén as well as online at the broadcaster's Eurosong website eurosong.een.be. The final was also broadcast online at the official Eurovision Song Contest website eurovision.tv.

Format
Thirty artists were selected to compete in Eurosong. Two casting shows aired on 2 and 9 February 2014 with each show featuring fifteen of the artists auditioning in front of a panel of experts by performing a cover version of a past Eurovision Song Contest song. The top four directly qualified to the semi-finals, while the fifth to eighth placed acts advanced to the Call Back round. The Call Back round took place on 16 February 2014 where an additional four artists as determined by the expert panel and public televoting qualified to the semi-finals. Three semi-finals took place on 23 February 2014, 3 March 2014 and 9 March 2014 where each artist presented their candidate Eurovision song. Each show featured four artists and the top two as determined by the expert panel and public televoting qualified to the final. The final took place on 16 March 2014 where the winner was chosen by seven international jury groups and public televoting.

During each of the seven shows, the expert panel provided commentary and feedback to the artists as well as selected entries to advance in the competition. The experts were:

 Bart Peeters – singer and television presenter
 Piet Goddaer – musician known by his stage name Ozark Henry
 Jef Martens – musician and DJ known by various aliases such as Basto and Lazy Jay
 Ruslana – Ukrainian singer, winner of the Eurovision Song Contest 2004

Competing entries
On 1 October 2013, VRT opened two separate submission forms: one for artists to submit a video recording of them performing a cover version of a past Eurovision Song Contest song and another for songwriters to submit their songs. The submission deadline for the two applications concluded on 14 October 2013 and 28 October 2013, respectively. The names of the thirty acts selected for the competition were announced on 24 January 2014. Among the competing artists were former Eurovision Song Contest participants Veronica Codesal (member of Aelia), who represented Belgium in 2003 as part of the group Urban Trad, and Kate Ryan (lead singer of Day One), who represented Belgium in 2006. Sixteen songs were selected by VRT from those received during the submission period and matched with the artists that advanced from the casting shows. The four artists that failed to advance from the Call Back round to the semi-finals (Jessy, Joyce, Mr. Jones and White Bird) did not perform their candidate Eurovision songs during the competition.

Casting shows 
The two casting shows aired on 2 and 9 February 2014 and took place at the Sportpaleis in Antwerp. Both shows were filmed earlier on 3 December 2013. Ruslana was unable to attend the casting shows due to her involvement in the pro-European Union protests in Ukraine. In each show fifteen artists performed a cover version of a past Eurovision Song Contest song and the expert panel determined four acts that qualified to the semi-finals and an additional four acts that advanced to the Call Back round.

Call Back 
The Call Back round took place on 9 February 2014 at the Videohouse in Vilvoorde. The eight artists that placed fifth to eighth in the preceding two casting shows each performed a cover version of a past Eurovision Song Contest song and the combination of results from the expert panel and a public televote determined the top four that qualified to the semi-finals.

Semi-finals 
The three semi-finals took place on 23 February, 2 March and 9 March 2014 at the Videohouse in Vilvoorde. In each show four artists performed their candidate songs for the 2014 Eurovision Song Contest and the combination of results from the expert panel and a public televote determined the top two that qualified to the final.

Final
The final took place on 16 March 2014 at the Sportpaleis in Antwerp where the six entries that qualified from the preceding three semi-finals competed. The winner, "Mother" performed by Axel Hirsoux, was selected by the combination of results from seven international jury groups and a public televote. The public and the jury each had a total of 280 points to award. Each of the jury groups awarded points in the following manner: 4, 6, 8, 10 and 12 points, while the televote awarded points based on the percentage of votes each song achieved. For example, if a song gained 10% of the viewer vote, then that entry would be awarded 10% of 280 points rounded to the nearest integer: 28 points. The expert panel participated in the final solely in an advisory role.

Ratings

Promotion 
On 14 April, Axel Hirsoux filmed the music video for "Mother" at the Vaudeville Theater in Brussels together with 200 mothers that VRT sought through an application period. The video was released to the public on 25 April. Axel Hirsoux specifically promoted "Mother" as the Belgian Eurovision entry on 31 March 2014 by performing during the Eurovision in Concert event which was held at the Melkweg venue in Amsterdam, Netherlands and hosted by Cornald Maas and Sandra Reemer.

At Eurovision

According to Eurovision rules, all nations with the exceptions of the host country and the "Big Five" (France, Germany, Italy, Spain and the United Kingdom) are required to qualify from one of two semi-finals in order to compete for the final; the top ten countries from each semi-final progress to the final. The European Broadcasting Union (EBU) split up the competing countries into six different pots based on voting patterns from previous contests, with countries with favourable voting histories put into the same pot. On 20 January 2014, a special allocation draw was held which placed each country into one of the two semi-finals, as well as which half of the show they would perform in. Belgium was placed into the first semi-final, to be held on 6 May 2014, and was scheduled to perform in the second half of the show.

Once all the competing songs for the 2014 contest had been released, the running order for the semi-finals was decided by the shows' producers rather than through another draw, so that similar songs were not placed next to each other. Belgium was set to perform in position 10, following the entry from Ukraine and before the entry from Moldova.

The two semi-finals and the final was broadcast in Belgium by both the Flemish and Walloon broadcasters. VRT broadcast the shows on één and Radio 2 with commentary in Dutch by Peter Van de Veire and Eva Daeleman. RTBF televised the shows on La Une with commentary in French by Jean-Louis Lahaye and Maureen Louys. The final was also broadcast by RTBF on VivaCité with commentary in French by Olivier Gilain. The Belgian spokesperson, who announced the Belgian votes during the final, was Angelique Vlieghe.

Semi-final 

Axel Hirsoux took part in technical rehearsals on 29 April and 2 May, followed by dress rehearsals on 5 and 6 May. This included the jury show on 5 May where the professional juries of each country watched and voted on the competing entries.

The Belgian performance featured Axel Hirsoux dressed in a black suit and bow tie and joined by a female dancer in a long black dress who performed gentle choreography that symbolised the mother's love of a child. The stage colour was purple and the LED screens displayed flowery sketches. The performance also featured moving spotlights and the use of a wind machine. The dancer that joined Axel Hirsoux during the performance was Isabelle Beernaert, who also choreographed the Belgian performance.

At the end of the show, Belgium was not announced among the top 10 entries in the first semi-final and therefore failed to qualify to compete in the final. It was later revealed that Belgium placed fourteenth in the semi-final, receiving a total of 28 points.

Voting 
Voting during the three shows consisted of 50 percent public televoting and 50 percent from a jury deliberation. The jury consisted of five music industry professionals who were citizens of the country they represent, with their names published before the contest to ensure transparency. This jury was asked to judge each contestant based on: vocal capacity; the stage performance; the song's composition and originality; and the overall impression by the act. In addition, no member of a national jury could be related in any way to any of the competing acts in such a way that they cannot vote impartially and independently. The individual rankings of each jury member were released shortly after the grand final.

Following the release of the full split voting by the EBU after the conclusion of the competition, it was revealed that Belgium had placed eleventh with both the public televote and fourteenth with the jury vote in the first semi-final. In the public vote, Belgium scored 41 points, while with the jury vote, Belgium scored 24 points.

Below is a breakdown of points awarded to Belgium and awarded by Belgium in the first semi-final and grand final of the contest, and the breakdown of the jury voting and televoting conducted during the two shows:

Points awarded to Belgium

Points awarded by Belgium

Detailed voting results
The following members comprised the Belgian jury:
  (jury chairperson)musician, singer, producer, artist, manager, represented Belgium in the 1991 contest as part of Clouseau
 Laura van den Bruel (Iris)singer, represented Belgium in the 2012 contest
 radio DJ, television host, artist
 Yannic Fonderiemusic producer, composer
 Wouter Vander Vekenmusic producer, composer, label manager

Notes and references

Notes

References

2014
Countries in the Eurovision Song Contest 2014
Eurovision
Articles containing video clips